Blyth's hawk-eagle (Nisaetus alboniger) (earlier treated as Spizaetus) is a medium-sized bird of prey. Like all eagles, it is in the family Accipitridae.

It can be found in the Malay Peninsula, Singapore, Sumatra and Borneo. It is a bird of open woodland, although island forms prefer a higher tree density. It builds a stick nest in a tree and lays a single egg.

The adult has a thick white band on uppertail and undertail, all black above, black spotted breast, barred below. It has a prominent crest like the bazas. Juvenile is dark brown above, and has a light brown head and underparts.

The common name commemorates Edward Blyth (1810–1873), English zoologist and Curator of the Museum of the Asiatic Society of Bengal.

References

External links 

 BirdLife Species Factsheet

Blyth's hawk-eagle
Birds of Malesia
Blyth's hawk-eagle
Blyth's hawk-eagle